Brembio is a comune (municipality) in the Province of Lodi in the Italian region Lombardy, located about  southeast of Milan and about  southeast of Lodi. Its inhabitants are called "Brembiesi".

Brembio borders the following municipalities: Mairago, Ossago Lodigiano, Secugnago, Borghetto Lodigiano, Casalpusterlengo, Livraga, Ospedaletto Lodigiano.

Economy
Some industries work in the mechanic and alimentary sectors. There are also numerous agricultural activities, often at a familiar level.

History
Of Roman origin, it belonged to the Monastery of "San Pietro in Ciel d'Oro" in Pavia (725). 
Then, it belonged to the church of "Santa Maria" in Lodi and, later, it became a fief of various Lodi families.

During the Napoleonic Era (1809-16), the municipality of Brembio was attached to "Cà del Bosco". With the constitution of the Kingdom of Lombardy-Veneto, Brembio was aggregated permanently in 1837.

Twin towns
Brembio is twinned with:

  Saint-Christo-en-Jarez, France, since 2004

References

External links
 Official website

 Cities and towns in Lombardy